Guanbei is a town of Zhao'an County in southernmost Fujian province, China, near the border with Guangdong and  north-northwest of the county seat. , It has 17 villages under its administration.

References 

Township-level divisions of Fujian
Zhao'an County